Saint-Yan Airport, also known as Charolais Bourgogne Sud Airport, is an airport in Saint-Yan, a commune of the Saône-et-Loire department in the Burgundy (Bourgogne) region of France. A campus of the École nationale de l'aviation civile (French civil aviation university) is located on the airport.

Facilities
It also has a parallel grass runway which measures .

Statistics

References

External links
 Saint-Yan Air'e Business
 
 

Airports in Bourgogne-Franche-Comté
Buildings and structures in Saône-et-Loire